The Northern Sierra Madre forest monitor (Varanus bitatawa), also known by the local names bitatawa, baritatawa, and butikaw, is a large, arboreal, frugivorous lizard of the genus Varanus. The lizard is a distinctive food of the Aeta and Ilongot indigenous people of the Philippines.

Description

Its scaly body and legs are a blue-black mottled with pale yellow-green dots, while its tail is marked in alternating segments of black and green. Dorsal ground coloration is black, accentuated with bright golden yellow in life, while the dorsum is golden yellow spots and flecks.

News reports emphasized that males have hemipenes, paired penis-like organs. However, all male lizards and snakes have hemipenes.

Behavior
Varanus bitatawa is one of only three frugivorous lizards in the Varanidae family along with V. olivaceus and V. mabitang.

The Northern Sierra Madre forest monitor specializes in eating the fruit of Pandan palm trees. They spend most of their time in trees, more than 20 meters above the ground; similar species spend less than 20 minutes on the ground per week.

Taxonomy and distributionVaranus bitatawa was described as a new species in April 2010 by biologists from the University of Kansas. DNA analysis has revealed genetic divergence between this species and its closest relative, Gray's Monitor (Varanus olivaceus), which is also a fruit-eater, but lives on the southern end of Luzon, rather than the northern end where the forest monitor lizard lives.

The known range of Varanus bitatawa is currently limited to the Sierra Madre Forest on the northeastern coast of the island of Luzon, Philippines.Varanus bitatawa is most closely related to another species of fruit-eating monitor from the Philippines, V. olivaceus. The relationship of these two species to the third known species of fruit-eating monitor, V. mabitang, is unknown due to a lack of genetic data on V. mabitang, but similar genital morphology suggests that these three species are each others' closest relatives (sometimes referred to as subgenus Philippinosaurus).

Fruit-eating monitor lizards are most closely related to a larger Indo-Asian clade of small monitor lizards that includes the arboreal V. prasinus complex and the mangrove monitors (V. indicus complex). They are more distantly related to other Indo-Asian monitor lizards, such as V. salvator'', and still more distantly related to Indo-Australian monitors, including the well-known Komodo dragon of Indonesia.

References

External links

 Images of Varanus bitatawa from Reuters
 Background and images of Varanus bitatawa
 Giant Frugivorous Monitor Lizards in the Philippines

Fauna of Luzon
Reptiles of the Philippines
Reptiles described in 2010
Varanus